Bukar–Sadong is an Austronesian language mainly spoken by Bidayuh people in Sarawak but also in bordering regions of West Kalimantan, Indonesia. McGinn (2009) proposes that it is the closest relative of the divergent Rejang language of Sumatra.

References

Languages of Indonesia
Languages of Malaysia
Land Dayak languages